Sacred Heart of Jesus Church is a historic Roman Catholic church on Berger Street in Lawrenceburg, Tennessee.

The church was founded in 1869-70 for German Catholics settling in the Lawrenceburg area. The land for the church was purchased by the Cincinnati Homestead Society. Father Henry Hueser was the first priest; initially services were held in his house. The first church building was a frame building completed in 1872. The church's present brick building was completed in 1887, at which time the earlier frame church was converted into a school.

The church was added to the National Register of Historic Places in 1984.

References

External links
 Sacred Heart Catholic Church website

Roman Catholic churches in Tennessee
Churches on the National Register of Historic Places in Tennessee
Roman Catholic churches completed in 1887
19th-century Roman Catholic church buildings in the United States
Buildings and structures in Lawrence County, Tennessee
National Register of Historic Places in Lawrence County, Tennessee